The 1915 Purdue Boilermakers football team was an American football team that represented Purdue University during the 1915 college football season. In their third season under head coach Andy Smith, the Boilermakers compiled a 3–3–1 record, finished in a tie for fifth place in the Western Conference with a 2–2 record against conference opponents, and scored and allowed the same number of points, 62. Frank B. Blocker was the team captain.

Schedule

References

Purdue
Purdue Boilermakers football seasons
Purdue Boilermakers football